Vincent F. Byron was a British colonial governor. He was magistrate of Anguilla from 1962 to 31 May 1967, although he left Anguilla on 9 March 1967.

References

Chief magistrates of Anguilla